"Without Fear" is a series of comic books featuring the superhero Daredevil. 

Without Fear may also refer to:

Without Fear (album), a 2019 album by Dermot Kennedy
"Without Fear", a song by Lacuna Coil from the 2006 album Karmacode